Tempête was a  (torpilleur d'escadre) built for the French Navy during the 1920s.

Design and description
They were powered by two geared steam turbines, each driving one propeller shaft, using steam provided by three du Temple boilers.

The main armament of the Bourrasque-class ships consisted of four Canon de  Modèle 1919 guns in shielded single mounts, one superfiring pair each fore and aft of the superstructure. Their anti-aircraft (AA) armament consisted of a single Canon de  Modèle 1924 gun. The ships carried two triple mounts of  torpedo tubes amidships. A pair of depth charge chutes were built into their stern that housed a total of sixteen  depth charges.

Notes

References

 
 

Bourrasque-class destroyers
World War II destroyers of France
Ships built in France
1925 ships
Ships built by Chantiers Dubigeon